KLJJ-LP (101.5 FM) is a terrestrial American low power radio station, licensed to Spring, Texas, United States, and is owned by The Lion of the Tribe of Judah of Conroe, Texas.

KLJJ's tower site is located directly behind the former 106.9 KJOJ-FM and 880 KJOJ studio building on Interstate Highway 45 north, between Texas State Highway 242 and Research Forest Drive in Shenandoah, Texas.

References

External links

LJJ-LP
Radio stations established in 2016
LJJ-LP